Paule Vézelay (1892–1984)  was a British painter.

Biography
Vézelay was born Marjorie Watson-Williams in Bristol, a daughter of the pioneering ENT surgeon, Patrick Watson-Williams (1863-1938). Before the First World War she trained for a short period at the Slade School of Fine Art and then at the London School of Art. She first gained recognition as a figurative painter, had her first London show in 1921 and was invited to join the London Group in 1922. She moved to France in 1926 and changed her name to Paule Vézelay possibly to identify herself with the School of Paris. In 1928 she abandoned figurative painting and made her first abstract work (which is now lost) and from then on worked exclusively in an abstract mode. In 1929 she met André Masson whom she fell in love and lived with for four years. Working side by side, they both painted dreamlike surrealist works. Vezelay became well respected in modernist Parisian art circles and was elected in the 1930s to membership of the French abstract movement, Abstraction-Création, which was largely established as a reaction to Surrealism.

On the outbreak of the Second World War Vézelay moved back to London, but had difficulty in gaining recognition from the British art establishment, possibly because of her identification with Paris at a time when the London art world was beginning to acquire its own separate and different reputation. However, in 1952 she was invited by Andre Bloc, president of the Parisian constructivist abstract movement Groupe Espace, to form a London branch of that movement. After many difficulties and the refusal of some leading British abstract artists to join (including Victor Pasmore), she was successful in forming a small group of painters, sculptors and architects who held an exhibition in the Royal Festival Hall in 1955 which anticipated many elements of the much better known 1956 Whitechapel Gallery exhibition, This is Tomorrow. In the 1950s she made textile designs for Metz of Amsterdam and Heals of London. In many of her works, Vézelay's abstract imagery, such as floating quasi-biomorphic shapes, was outside the main characteristics of the constructivist approach. She had a lifelong aim of creating works which were "pleasing and happy” – not terms generally associated with Constructivism. However, her view that 'pure' abstract art enhanced the environment, and her involvement with Groupe Espace in the 1950s which promoted the concept of a synthesis (or close collaboration) between architects and abstract painters and sculptors, place her at least in part within the Constructivist tradition. Her post-war textile designs for Heals also place her firmly within the 20th century Modern Movement.

The Tate gave Vézelay a retrospective exhibition in 1983 – a late recognition of the quality of her work and her significant place in art history as one of the first British artists to embark on a lifetime exploration and development of abstraction.

Paule Vézelay was also included in Pallant House Radical Women exhibition, focusing on the works of Jessica Dismorr and her contemporaries, in early 2020.

References

 England, Jane, exhibition catalogues, 'Paule Vezelay, England Gallery, 2000, 2004, 2007
 Fowler. Alan,'Constructivist Art in Britain 1913 - 2005''. University of Southampton. 2006. PhD Thesis.
 Fowler, Alan, article in Burlington Magazine, 'A Forgotten British Constructivist Group: the London Branch of Groupe Espace' March 2007.
 'PAULE VEZELAY', Courtauld Institute of Art 

1892 births
1984 deaths
20th-century English painters
20th-century English women artists
Alumni of the Slade School of Fine Art
Artists from Bristol
Modern painters
English women painters